Esmatabad (also Romanized as ‘Eşmatābād; also known as Shahrak-e Khowrmīz-e Soflá) is a village in Khvormiz Rural District, in the Central District of Mehriz County, Yazd Province, Iran. At the 2006 census, its population was 880, in 223 families.

References 

Populated places in Mehriz County